Fieberiella florii, known generally as privet leafhopper, is a species of leafhopper in the family Cicadellidae. Other common names include the Flor's leafhopper and cherry leafhopper. It is native to Europe and has been established in the United States and Canada.

References

Further reading

External links

 

Fieberiellini
Hemiptera of Europe
Insects described in 1864
Taxa named by Carl Stål